Cristian Alexandru Albu (born 17 August 1993) is a Romanian professional footballer who plays as a defensive midfielder for Liga I club Rapid București.

International career
He made his debut for the Romania national football team on 8 October 2021 in a World Cup qualifier against Germany.

Career statistics

Club

International

Honours

Concordia Chiajna
Cupa Ligii runner-up: 2015–16

References

External links
 
 

1993 births
Living people
Romanian footballers
Romania international footballers
Footballers from Bucharest
Association football midfielders
Liga I players
Liga II players
CS Concordia Chiajna players
LPS HD Clinceni players
FC UTA Arad players
FC Rapid București players